New Frankley in Birmingham is a civil parish in Birmingham, England. As such, it has its own parish council.

History
It was established in 2000 in an area in the south-west of the city south of Bartley Reservoir (map), transferred from Bromsgrove (and thus also from Hereford & Worcester to the West Midlands County) in 1995, which had previously been part of the Frankley parish.

Description
The parish borders Frankley parish in Bromsgrove District to the north, the unparished area of Birmingham to the east, the unparished area of Rubery to the south, and Romsley parish to the west. According to the 2001 census the parish had a population of 7,890.

Frankley Beeches
In 1930, Frankley Beeches, "a prominent viewpoint 800 ft above sea level", a small wood or beech copse from which the old Bournville factory was visible, was given by the Cadbury company to the National Trust in memory of Richard and George Cadbury.

See also
Frankley Reservoir
Frankley Water Treatment Works
King Edward VI Balaam Wood Academy
Government of Birmingham, England
Evolution of Worcestershire county boundaries

References

External links
Parish Council

Areas of Birmingham, West Midlands
Civil parishes in the West Midlands (county)
Local government in Birmingham, West Midlands